Crateva magna is a small wild or cultivated tree native to India, China, Bangladesh, Sri Lanka, Burma, Indo-China, Indonesia, and Malaysia. It is often found along streams, also in dry, deep boulder formations in Sub-Himalayan tracts.

Crateva nurvala is now generally considered to be a synonym of this species.

Uses

Medicinal uses
The dried bark is used raw drug in traditional systems of medicine in India such as Ayurveda, siddha etc. The decoction of bark is internally administered to cure diseases like renal calculi, dysuria, helminthiasis, inflammations and abscesses. The decoction exhibits actions like carminative, laxative, thermogenic, diuretic, lithontriptic, expectorant and demulcent. The leaf and stem bark have been evaluated for their antioxidant activity and inhibition of key enzymes relevant to hyperglycemia.

Parts used
Dried bark and leaves are used for medicinal purposes.

References

External links
 
 

Medicinal plants of Asia
Capparaceae
Flora of Indo-China
Flora of Malesia